Ondřejov is a municipality and village in Prague-East District in the Central Bohemian Region of the Czech Republic. It has about 1,800 inhabitants. The historic centre is well preserved and is protected by law as an urban monument zone.

Administrative parts
The villages of Třemblat and Turkovice are administrative parts of Ondřejov.

History
The first written mention of Ondřejov is from 1352. The parish church is dated from around the first quarter of the 14th century. In the early modern period it was discovered that there were large amounts of silver ore in the municipality, prompting one of the village's main exports to be crafts such as pottery.

Demographics

Sights
The Church of Saints Simon and Jude was originally a Romanesque building, baroque modified in 1668. The adjacent Baroque building of the rectory was built in 1778–1780.

In 1898–1906 the industrialist Josef Jan Frič built the astronomical observatory in the village, which he gave to the Charles University in 1928. Today the Ondřejov Observatory is operated by the Astronomical Institute of the Czech Academy of Sciences. Its part is also the Vojtěch Šafařík Astronomical Museum.

References

External links

 

Villages in Prague-East District